The Astoria Palace Hotel is a hotel in Copacabana, Rio de Janeiro, Brazil. It faces the Copacabana Beach and is located just metres west of the Copacabana Palace Hotel. It is one of the newest hotels in the area and has 115 rooms.

References

External links
Official site

Hotels in Rio de Janeiro (city)
Copacabana, Rio de Janeiro
Hotels established in 2007